The Old Apostolic Church (OAC) is a church with roots in the Catholic Apostolic Church.

History
The Old Apostolic Church's roots are found in the Catholic Apostolic Church that was established in 1832 as an outflow of the Albury Movement.

Establishment in Africa
The founder of the Apostolic Church in South Africa, Carl George Klibbe, was born on 24 December 1852 in Pomerania at the Baltic Sea and was a preacher in the Lutheran Church when he had contact with the Apostolic doctrine in a town named Schladen in Germany where he met Heinrich Niemeyer for the first time. It was years later in 1886, after Klibbe moved to Hatton Vale in Queensland, Australia, that he and his family were convinced of this doctrine and sealed by the same person Apostle H. F. Niemeyer.

OAC after Apostle Klibbe
At the time of Klibbe's death on 22 May 1931, The Old Apostolic Church had more than 1 million adherents. Apostles Ernest Fredrick Willhelm Ninow, Carl Fredrick Willhelm Ninow and William Campbell were appointed by Klibbe as his successors before he died, with EFW Ninow as the Chairman and Leader of the church.

At present, The Old Apostolic Church is estimated to have around 2 million members in Africa.  Congregations can be found in South Africa, Eswatini, Namibia, Zimbabwe, Mozambique, Botswana, Zambia, Malawi, USA, Canada, British Isles, Netherlands, Belgium, Australia, New Zealand and the United Arab Emirates. The Old Apostolic Church is independent from the New Apostolic Church and the United Apostolic Church, and is not part of the South African Council of Churches or the World Council of Churches, and refuses to become members of these organisations.

Schisms from the OAC
The following groups broke away from The Old Apostolic Church:
 1925 "Apostolic Church" under the leadership of Heinrich Velde, the son in law of Apostle Klibbe. This group became part of the Apostolic Church of South Africa - Apostle Unity and the United Apostolic Church.
 1968 Twelve Apostles Church of Africa, due to doctrinal differences under the leadership of Helper-Apostle Jim Scotch Ndlovu after he was removed from office.
 1972 Reformed Old Apostolic Church under the leadership of Helper-Apostle Robert Lombard, broke away due to the unwillingness of The Old Apostolic Church leadership to take part in political debate concerning racial segregation, and a leadership dispute with the Apostolate of the OAC concerning revelations received by Lombard. It was first established as the Non-White Old Apostolic Church but forced to change its name in a court case in 1975
 1993 The Foundation of Apostles and Prophets Church, was founded by Vuyisilile Naborth Vika, a former Helper-Apostle of the OAC who was removed from office in 1990 for actively promoting politics within the church, in contravention to church policy.

Views

Politics
Members of the Old Apostolic Church are not allowed to become registered members of any political parties, stand for election, or openly declare their political views. The OAC do not support any political parties. Members are however allowed to vote according to their conscience.

Officers are strictly forbidden to endorse any political party and may be removed from office if they do endorse any party.

Members must obey all laws of the countries in which they reside, even if the member is to suffer anguish.

The leadership of the Old Apostolic Church did make some submissions to the Truth and Reconciliation Commission (South Africa), and was the only Apostolic (Irvingist) Church to do so.  This submission was not an admission of guilt, and the Church was not accused or found guilty of contravening any laws or international laws.  The church policy stipulates that all assistance will be given to government as required by law.

Bible
The Old Apostolic Church recognises and uses the Authorised King James Version.  All Bibles used must be comparable to the Authorised King James Version.  The Afrikaanse Ou Vertaling (Hersiene Uitgawe) is used in Afrikaans-speaking congregations.  In Germany the 1912 Luther Bible is used.

Before the introduction of the first Bible in Afrikaans in 1933, the Dutch Bible was used mostly among Afrikaans-speaking members.

The Old Apostolic Church Confession of Faith extracts:
We believe in the Holy Scriptures, the Old and the New Testament, and in the fulfillment of the promises contained therein

Bibles in use
The following Bible translations are officially sanctioned by the Conference of Apostles for use in the church:  
 Afrikaans: Bybel in Afrikaans (1933–1957) 
 English: King James Version (1611)
 English: New King James Version (Thomas Nelson – 1983)
 Dutch: Staten Generaal (1618 and 1619)
 German: The Bible in German - Bible text translation by Martin Luther - (1912 and 1984 Revision)
 Portuguese: The Bible in Portuguese (A Biblia Sagrada; Contendo O Vehlo EO Novo Testamento) 1100 Lisbon, Portugal
 Sepedi: The Bible in Northern Sotho (1951 and 1986)
 Sesotho: The Bible in Southern Sotho (Biblele E Halalelang, 1961 and 1983)
 Setswana: The Bible in Tswana (Baebele E E Boitshepo, 1908–1992)
 Xitsonga: The Bible in Xitsonga (Bibele Yi NEA; Testamente Ya Khale Ni Le'yint_ha 1929–1987)
 Xhosa: The Bible in Xhosa (Incwadi Yezibhalo Ezingcwele, 1971)
 Zulu: The Bible in Zulu (First SA Edition, 1977)

All other Bible translations in other languages may be used, with the permission of the local Forum of Apostles if it compares with the Authorised King James Version.

References

Further reading
 Tang, M.J.: Het Apostolische Werk in Nederland.
 History of the New Apostolic Church in South East Africa
 History of the Apostolic Church of Queensland

External links
 Old Apostolic Church (official website)

Catholic Apostolic Church denominations
Christian denominations in South Africa
Religious organizations established in 1860